WPRU-LP, UHF analog channel 20, was a low-power ABC-affiliated television station licensed to Aguadilla, Puerto Rico. The station was owned by the Caribbean Broadcasting Network.

History
The channel was launched in 2004.

The station did not provide their own local newscasts.

In September 2014, it was announced that ABC would move to WORA-TV on November 1 as a new subchannel. In late 2019, the ABC affiliation moved to the main channel of WORA-DT, after Telemundo discontinued its WKAQ-TV repeater on WORA-TV.

The station has been silent since January 2014. From that point until the ABC affiliation ended, it continued broadcasting on channel 18.1 of sister station WSJP-LD. At some point on March 20, 2015, WSJP-LD removed its simulcast of WORA-DT2/ABC 5 from 18.1 and moved its third subchannel to 18.1 from 18.3 to replace it.

Caribbean Broadcasting Network surrendered WPRU-LP's license to the Federal Communications Commission on January 14, 2021, who cancelled it the same day.

References

 

Aguadilla, Puerto Rico
Television channels and stations established in 2005
2005 establishments in Puerto Rico
PRU-LP
Television channels and stations disestablished in 2021
2021 disestablishments in Puerto Rico
PRU-LP
Defunct television stations in the United States
ABC network affiliates